Eslamabad-e Lishtar (also Romanized as Eslāmābād-e Līshtar; also known as Eslāmābād, Līshtar, Līshtar-e ‘Arabhā, Līshtar-e Bālā, and Līshtar Sardār) is a village in Lishtar Rural District, in the Central District of Gachsaran County, Kohgiluyeh and Boyer-Ahmad Province, Iran. At the 2006 census, its population was 894, in 172 families.

References 

Populated places in Gachsaran County